The 2011–12 Torquay United F.C. season was Torquay United's 76th season in the Football League and their third consecutive season in League Two. The season runs from 1 July 2011 to 30 June 2012.

Overview
Having narrowly missed out on promotion to League One after defeat by Stevenage in the previous season's League Two play-off Final, the 2011–12 season represents a new era for Torquay United with the departure of manager Paul Buckle and several of the squad who had taken part in last season's promotion challenge. As well as new manager Martin Ling having to rebuild the squad on the pitch, literal rebuilding off the pitch has started with the demolition of the old grandstand at Plainmoor and the construction of a new one, to be named 'Bristow's Bench' in honour of Torquay's late vice-chairman Paul Bristow.

League statistics

League Two

Results summary

Results by round

Season diary

July
Following the acquisitions in June of Joe Oastler, Chris McPhee and Daniel Leadbitter, Martin Ling further bolstered the Torquay United squad with two crucial defensive signings in goalkeeper Bobby Olejnik and centre back Brian Saah. Olejnik came with a fine pedigree having played for Falkirk in the Scottish Premier League while Saah had previously played under Ling at Leyton Orient and Cambridge United.  With Chris Zebroski making the decision to follow former manager Paul Buckle to Bristol Rovers, Ling needed to improve his attacking options which led to the signings of strikers Rene Howe and Taiwo Atieno and midfielder Ian Morris. Finally, as back-up to Bobby Olejnik, former Gulls keeper Martin Rice returned to Plainmoor after two seasons with Truro City.

A series of friendlies saw the new recruits bed in well with the established squad members with Howe, Atieno, McPhee, Oastler and Morris all helping themselves to goals in a pre-season programme which saw the Gulls lose just once (to Championship side Burnley).  Particularly pleasing to Torquay supporters were the defeat of another Championship side Bristol City and a 3–0 victory over bitter rivals Exeter City.  The pre-season fixtures ended with a 6–2 win over Truro City, who included among their ranks the young defender Ed Palmer who had only just joined the Cornish club on loan from Torquay.

With Martin Ling seemingly satisfied with his squad, Torquay supporters now braced themselves for another season.

August
The optimism of the new season was swiftly dashed when striker Justin Richards scored twice early in the second half to put Burton Albion 2–0 ahead in the opening day fixture at Plainmoor.  However, Torquay were able to show enough character to respond to this setback with Rene Howe and captain Lee Mansell both scoring to salvage a 2–2 draw. Next up was a trip to St Mary's for a Carling Cup First Round fixture with Southampton.  Despite a spirited performance, the Gulls were unable to overcome a strong Saints side and had to accept a 4–1 defeat as well as the fact that Torquay had now gone ten years without reaching the Second Round of the League Cup.  However, the Gulls did not have to wait much longer for their first victory of the season and it was to be a particularly enjoyable one for the Torquay fans as it came at the home of Paul Buckle's new side Bristol Rovers.  Goals from Taiwo Atieno and Rene Howe in the first fifteen minutes was enough to secure all three points at the Memorial Stadium, despite Byron Anthony snatching one back for Rovers in the second half.  Back to back away victories were then achieved with a hard-fought 1–0 win at Aldershot, pushing the Gulls up to 4th in the League Two table.  However, Torquay were soon brought back down to earth when newly promoted Crawley Town came to Plainmoor and easily outplayed the home side in a 3–1 defeat of the Gulls.  The consolation goal was Lee Mansell's fourth of the campaign and left the midfielder in the unlikely position as the club's top scorer for the season so far.

Spirits were raised after that defeat with the loan signing of promising young forward Billy Bodin from Swindon Town. However, it soon became clear that he had arrived as a replacement for his namesake Billy Kee who was sold to Burton Albion the very next day.  Kee had struggled to secure a place in the starting line up under Paul Buckle and, with Howe and Atieno beginning to establish an effective striking partnership under Martin Ling, Kee took the opportunity to join the Brewers and return to his native Midlands. Some pride was restored after the Crawley humiliation with a 1–1 draw at Dagenham & Redbridge, leaving the Gulls' undefeated away record intact, at least as far as the League was concerned.  However, a trip to Whaddon Road in the Johnstone Paints Trophy saw another early cup exit for Torquay at the hands of Cheltenham Town.

While the cup defeats were disappointing, it was clear that Martin Ling's focus was firmly on the League campaign.  Two wins, two draws and one defeat represented a solid start to the season and the overall performances of the new look Torquay squad suggested that there were perhaps more reasons for the Gulls fans to be positive than not.

September
With Rene Howe suffering from a hamstring injury and Billy Bodin on international duty with the Wales under-21 squad, Martin Ling was presented with a mini striker crisis before the visit of Macclesfield Town for the first fixture of the month. Despite this, Torquay managed to register their biggest win of the campaign so far with a 3–0 defeat of the Silkmen thanks to first goals of the season from Brian Saah, Chris McPhee and Eunan O'Kane.  Howe was fit enough to be restored to the starting line-up alongside Bodin for the next match which, ironically, resulted in a lacklustre 0–0 draw with Northampton Town at the Sixfields Stadium.  This was then followed up by two further draws against Cheltenham Town and Rotherham United, both at Plainmoor.  Although these were far more entertaining matches than the Northampton stalemate, it was concerning that Torquay had fallen behind within the first five minutes of both games.  However, the Gulls did at least show the desire to fight back in both games, gaining a 2–2 result against Cheltenham and finishing the epic Rotherham encounter with a 3–3 scoreline.  Nevertheless, Martin Ling was now growing concerned at the prospect of Torquay becoming the League's 'draw specialists'.

Morale was boosted before the trip to Shrewsbury Town with the news that Eunan O'Kane had signed a new contract keeping the midfielder at Plainmoor until 2014. However, it was not such good news on the pitch with the Shrews gaining revenge for last season's play-off defeat, beating the Gulls 2–0 in a match which also saw Rene Howe dismissed for a second bookable offence.  It was a disappointing end to a month which left the Gulls in 13th position in the League Two table having started it in 12th. It was now becoming clear that if Torquay were to avoid a season of mid-table mediocrity (or worse), they would need to start converting some of their draws into wins.

October
If Torquay United were hoping their indifferent fortunes would improve with the start of a new month, they were to be sorely disappointed.  Early in the month the team received a blow with the news that midfielder Ian Morris had picked up a knee injury which threatened to rule him out for at least a couple of months. On the pitch, despite holding league leaders Morecambe to a 1–1 draw at Plainmoor in their opening fixture of the month, the Gulls would then go on to lose their next three matches against Bradford City, Gillingham and Southend United by an aggregate margin of 10–3.  Perhaps the most disappointing result of the three was the 1–0 defeat by Bradford at Valley Parade.  Even with the Bantams being reduced to ten men after just 24 minutes, Torquay were still unable to penetrate a defence which had not kept a clean sheet in their previous 18 league games.  The following weeks's humiliating 5–2 home defeat by Gillingham prompted Martin Ling to recall out of favour defender Mark Ellis to the starting line up in the away fixture against Southend.  Although that game resulted in another expensive defeat, the final two fixtures of the month suggested Ling might have finally got the formula right with back to back home victories against AFC Wimbledon and Hereford United, both without conceding a goal.

Those two victories provided a welcome boost to Torquay after a demoralising eight game stretch without a win.  The Gulls were now hopeful they could create a platform from which the team could progress and, even if they could not reach last season's achievement of a play-off spot, they could at least distance themselves from any potential relegation dogfight.

November
November saw Torquay continue to build upon the foundations laid in the last two matches of October.  Following the wins over AFC Wimbledon and Hereford, the Gulls went to Gresty Road and recorded a convincing 3–0 win over Crewe Alexandra.  This was followed up by an equally impressive FA Cup First Round victory over League One side Chesterfield at the B2net Stadium.  The 3–1 win earned Torquay a potentially difficult tie in the Second Round with a trip to another League One outfit, Sheffield United.

While the Chesterfield match saw the earlier than expected return from injury of Ian Morris, the Gulls' next League encounter resulted in another long-term injury with defender Brian Saah picking up a serious tear to his groin. Although there was a ready-made replacement in Chris Robertson (who had recently lost his place in the team to Mark Ellis), the possible length of Saah's absence prompted Martin Ling to bring in young Colchester United defender Tom Aldred as cover until January. However, Saah's injury was probably the only negative point to a game which saw Torquay achieve their first League win over Devon rivals Plymouth Argyle since 1972.  A stunning second half brace from Eunan O'Kane helped the Gulls record a 3–1 victory over a Pilgrims side who were languishing at the bottom of League Two having only just been relegated from League One the previous season.

The final game of the month saw Torquay make a Friday night trip to Port Vale which, although only resulting in a goalless draw, did at least extend the Gulls' unbeaten run to six games in all competitions, with fifteen goals scored and just two conceded. With Torquay's bad run of form now a fading memory, there was reason again for the Plainmoor faithful to be optimistic.

December
Torquay could hardly have asked for a much tougher FA Cup Second Round fixture than a trip to League One high-flyers Sheffield United.  However, it would take just three minutes before Rene Howe stunned the Bramall Lane crowd by firing the Gulls into an early 1–0 lead.  United managed to defend stoutly against the Blades up until the 68th minute when a cruel Mark Ellis own goal levelled it for the home side before striker Ched Evans made it 2–1 within a minute of the restart.  Evans then went on to score a second goal to put the tie beyond the reach of Torquay before Danny Stevens scored a late consolation goal in injury time.  It was an impressive Torquay performance but the defeat meant that the Gulls would now only have the League Two campaign to concentrate on for the rest of the season.

Despite the cup exit, spirits were raised among the Torquay fans when it was announced that loyal servants Lee Mansell and Kevin Nicholson had both signed new contracts keeping them at Plainmoor until the summer of 2014. Nicholson celebrated his new deal by scoring deep into injury time to secure a 1–0 home win over Barnet.  However, this was then followed up by a poor performance against Accrington Stanley at the Crown Ground which saw Rene Howe sent off for the second time in the season.  Despite Accrington also later having a man sent off, the game resulted in a 3–1 defeat for Torquay and a four-match ban for Howe. Howe's suspension meant an opportunity for striker Taiwo Atieno to make his mark in the team having failed to find a regular place in the starting line up.  Atieno duly took his chance by scoring the only goal in the 1–0 defeat of Swindon in the Boxing Day fixture at Plainmoor, thus ending the Robins' 15-game unbeaten run.

Although 2011 would end on a slightly dull note with a somewhat uninspiring 0–0 home draw with Oxford United, with just three points separating themselves from the play-off positions, Martin Ling and the Torquay fans could reflect upon a wholly satisfying first half of the season.

January
Torquay got the New Year off to a flying start with a 2–1 victory over Plymouth Argyle.  It was the first time the Gulls had completed the League double over their Devon neighbours for over 40 years and their first win of any description at Home Park since January 2000.  The scoring was opened by Billy Bodin and it was to be his last contribution to the Gulls before he returned to Swindon Town following the completion of his loan deal.  Despite Martin Ling's best efforts, Robins boss Paolo Di Canio was reluctant to let Bodin return to Plainmoor, particularly with Torquay's recent good form making them potential rivals in the promotion race. With Brian Saah coming back to full fitness, defender Tom Aldred also returned to his parent club without making an appearance for the Gulls while Ed Palmer, Ray Spear and Lloyd Macklin all returned to Torquay following their loan spells at Truro, Bideford and Salisbury City respectively.

As Torquay's next scheduled League opponents Dagenham & Redbridge were still involved in the FA Cup, Torquay were able to enjoy an unexpected mid-winter break before the trip to Macclesfield Town.  The 12-day hiatus didn't seem to do the Gulls any harm as they returned from Moss Rose with another 2–1 victory thanks to the first goals of the season from Mark Ellis and Ian Morris.  Underlining the team's current consistency, this was then followed up by a third consecutive 2–1 away win at Morecambe with Ellis again getting on the score sheet.  Torquay's rearranged fixture against Dagenham resulted in a hard-fought 1–0 victory, while a similarly dogged performance from Northampton Town four days later saw another narrow 1–0 victory for the Gulls and a third goal in four games for defender Ellis.  It was Torquay's fifth consecutive victory and left them firmly in the play-off spots.

With the January transfer window open, Martin Ling had anticipated interest in his players, particularly with the side's current excellent form. When the inevitable enquiries came, it was defender Chris Robertson who had attracted the attention of other clubs. One of Torquay's longest serving players, Robertson's contract was due to expire in the summer and the Gulls took the option of accepting an undisclosed fee from League One side Preston North End for the player's services.

Despite the departure of Robertson and the unlikely return of Bodin, the transfer window closed with the squad still in good shape.  With 11 victories in 14 games, Torquay were now in an excellent position to continue their push for promotion to League One.

February
The icing on the cake for a near perfect January was the 'clean sweep' of Manager of the Month Award for Martin Ling and Player of the Month Award for centre back Mark Ellis. Fears of the 'curse' often associated with the Manager's award proved unfounded with Torquay stretching the winning run of games to seven with two more victories over promotion-chasing Shrewsbury and Cheltenham by a goal to nil.  In fact, the trip to Whaddon Road was the Gulls' fourth successive 1–0 victory and brought Torquay within one game of equalling the club record of eight successive wins achieved during the 1997–98 season.

With the squad now missing Chris Robertson and Billy Bodin, Martin Ling sought to bring in replacements for the departed pair.  First in was former Wales under-21 winger Nathan Craig.  Currently a free agent, Craig had impressed Ling while playing for the reserves and was offered what amounted to an extended trial until the end of the season. Another new face arrived in the shape of defender Angus MacDonald who was brought in on loan from Reading for the rest of the season. The new players had yet to make an appearance before Torquay's run of good form came to a shuddering halt with a surprise 2–1 defeat at Plainmoor to struggling Bradford City.  Fans may well have been wondering if they were feeling the delayed effects of the Manager of the Month 'curse' when the Gulls suffered a second successive loss away to Gillingham.  The 2–0 defeat at Priestfield ended in bizarre circumstances with the assistant referee flagging for a penalty when Brian Saah had seemingly brought down former Gulls-loanee Gavin Tomlin in the penalty box.  However, referee Jock Waugh (who had originally waved play-on) decided to send off Joe Oastler instead of Saah.  However, following an appeal, the FA rectified the error and the one-match ban was switched from Oastler to Saah.

Although it was inevitable that the incredible run of form would eventually come to an end, Torquay now had to return to winning ways as soon as possible if they were to maintain their bid for promotion.

March
With a daunting eight fixtures scheduled for the month, Martin Ling endeavoured to strengthen the squad with the signing of Ryan Jarvis on loan from League One Walsall.  Jarvis had previously played under Ling at Leyton Orient but had recently failed to cement a regular place in the Saddlers' first team and so was allowed to the join the Gulls until the end of the season. Jarvis made his Torquay debut when he came on as a sub for the injured Danny Stevens in the month's first fixture, a tricky tie away to Crawley Town.  Also making his debut for the Gulls was Angus MacDonald who came in for the suspended Brian Saah.  The young defender gave an assured performance in his first ever League appearance to help Torquay gain a 1–0 victory over their promotion-chasing rivals.  It was a particularly satisfying result for the Torquay fans after August's humiliating 3–1 defeat at Plainmoor and the previous season's FA Cup exit.

This was followed by back-to-back home games against Aldershot, where another 1–0 win sealed the points for the Gulls, and Bristol Rovers.  Although the Rovers match possibly lost some of the edge it may have had if Paul Buckle were still in charge of the Pirates, the tie still resulted in a thrilling spectacle with Plainmoor old boy Chris Zebroski putting Rovers 2–0 ahead in the 69th minute.  However, Torquay refused to be beaten and two goals in the last twenty minutes from captain Lee Mansell ensured the Gulls salvaged a point from the encounter.

Torquay were back on the road again for their next three fixtures, the first of which was a midweek trip up to Rotherham's Don Valley Stadium. Again, Lee Mansell was the man on the score sheet in another 1–0 victory for the Gulls.  If the Rotherham match was a demonstration of Torquay's dogged defending, their next match provided a display of the team's attacking prowess with a comfortable 4–1 victory over Burton Albion at the Pirelli Stadium.  It was to be manager Paul Peschisolido's last game in charge of the Brewers as he was sacked shortly afterwards. Coincidentally, Torquay's previous opponents Rotherham also parted company with their manager Andy Scott just two days later. Although it's unlikely that Swindon boss Paolo Di Canio would have been fearing for his own position when the Gulls arrived at the County Ground, he would certainly have been aware of the Torquay threat with the side now second in the table just behind Di Canio's men.  However, it was to prove a disappointing evening for the Gulls who were defeated 2–0 by the League leaders.  Fears that Torquay's bubble may finally have burst began to emerge after Port Vale went in 1–0 up at half time in their match at Plainmoor.  Yet again however, Martin Ling's men proved they had the spirit for the fight and came back to win the match 2–1 in the second half, the winner being Ryan Jarvis's first goal for the club.  An exhausting month finally came to an end with yet another 1–0 win against Barnet at Underhill.

In a season full of surprises, six wins and just one defeat in eight games was an extraordinary achievement.  With the Gulls firmly placed in the automatic promotion spots with just six games remaining, it was now time for Torquay to make the final push for a place in next season's League One.

April
For the second time during the season, Torquay achieved a clean sweep in the monthly awards with Martin Ling recognised as the League Two Manager of the Month again, this time being joined by captain Lee Mansell as the League's Player of the Month. Torquay's achievements received further recognition when Bobby Olejnik, Kevin Nicholson, Eunan O'Kane and Lee Mansell were all selected in the PFA League Two Team of the Year.  Having four players included in the season's 11-man squad was an astonishing accomplishment matched only by Manchester City in the Premier League and Charlton Athletic in League One. Nevertheless, despite all the awards, Torquay still had to focus on their fight for promotion to ensure that the season's efforts would not be wasted.

The march towards League One continued unabated with the Gulls' Good Friday encounter with Accrington resulting in the side's tenth 1–0 win of the season.  However, despite an early Rene Howe goal in the Easter Monday fixture with Oxford United, Torquay were perhaps fortunate to leave the Kassam Stadium with a point after Ian Morris was sent off in the 79th minute.  Only a late Taiwo Atieno strike salvaged a 2–2 draw for the Gulls after Oxford had already fought back to a 2–1 lead before the sending off.  However, the point did at least secure Torquay a place in the play-offs, although their sights were now firmly set on a much bigger prize.  The month's next fixture saw the visit of promotion-chasing rivals Southend to Plainmoor.  The two sides cancelled each other out in a 0–0 draw which did at least establish a new club record of 20 clean sheets in one season. The draw just managed to keep the Gulls in the automatic promotion spots although with both Shrewsbury and Crawley both winning their games in hand shortly afterwards, Torquay had dropped down to fourth spot before their trip to AFC Wimbledon.  A disappointing 2–0 defeat at Kingsmeadow did nothing to help the team's promotion prospects and appeared to suggest that Torquay's small squad may finally be running out of steam at the crucial moment.  However, the following week the Gulls seemed to have all three points in the bag back at home when they were 1–0 up against play-off hopefuls Crewe Alexandra before a 94th equaliser from Nick Powell robbed Torquay of two vital points.  Other results on the penultimate day of the season ensured Swindon were crowned champions of League Two while Shrewsbury became the second team to win automatic promotion.  However, a shock home defeat for Crawley at the hands of relegation threatened Hereford meant that only goal difference separated Torquay and Crawley for the vital third automatic promotion spot.  Meanwhile, just a point behind them both were Southend who could grab the coveted third spot if they won and Torquay and Crawley both failed to do so.  What would make the final day even more intriguing was the fact that Torquay had to travel to Crawley's victors Hereford who themselves would have to win their final match of the season to guarantee their League Two survival.

As had so often been the case throughout the years, Torquay's destiny would have to be decided on the final day of the season.

Results

League Two

League Two play-offs

FA Cup

League Cup

League Trophy

Friendlies

Devon St Luke's Bowl

Reserves

Club statistics

First team appearances

|-
|}
Source: Torquay United

Top scorers

Source: Torquay United

Disciplinary record

Source: Torquay United

. League Two statistics include the League Two play-offs.

Transfers

In

Loans in

Out

Loans out

References

2011–12 Football League Two by team
2011-12